The 4th constituency of Csongrád-Csanád County is one of the single member constituencies of the National Assembly, the national legislature of Hungary. The constituency standard abbreviation: Csongrád-Csanád 04. OEVK.

Since 2014, it has been represented by János Lázár of the Fidesz–KDNP party alliance.

Geography
The 4th constituency is located in eastern part of Csongrád-Csanád County.

List of municipalities
The constituency includes the following municipalities:

Members
The constituency was first represented by János Lázár of the Fidesz from 2014, and he was re-elected in 2018 and 2022.

References

Csongrád-Csanád 4th